The Canchal de la Ceja is a 2,428 metres high mountain in Spain.

Etymology 
Canchal means scree; the name Ceja (literally eyebrow) comes from the peculiar shape of the snowfield located below the summit on the North face of the mountain .

Geography 
The mountain is located on the border between the provinces of Ávila and Salamanca, both belonging to Castile and León autonomous community. It's the highest peak of the mountain range called Sierra de Béjar and of Province of Salamanca.

The lakes located around the mountain are the largest in the Sierra de Gredos area.

Access to the summit 
The shortest route to the summit starts from Plataforma del Travieso (1850 m, around 10 km from Candelario) and takes a couple of hours hiking. The North face of the mountain offers some climbing routes.

See also

Sistema Central

References

Bibliography

External links
  Hiking route to Canchal de la Ceja

Sistema Central
Mountains of Castile and León
Geography of the Province of Salamanca
Geography of the Province of Ávila
Two-thousanders of Spain